Royal Palm Estates is a census-designated place (CDP) in Palm Beach County, Florida, United States. The population was 1,974 at the 2020 census.

Geography
Royal Palm Estates is located at  (26.680793, -80.127214).

According to the United States Census Bureau, the CDP has a total area of 2.1 km (0.8 mi2), all land.

Demographics

As of the census of 2000, there were 3,583 people, 1,126 households, and 835 families residing in the CDP.  The population density was 1,729.3/km (4,451.1/mi2).  There were 1,204 housing units at an average density of 581.1/km (1,495.7/mi2).  The racial makeup of the CDP was 69.83% White (47.2% were Non-Hispanic White,) 15.27% African American, 0.45% Native American, 1.28% Asian, 0.11% Pacific Islander, 8.54% from other races, and 4.52% from two or more races. Hispanic or Latino of any race were 34.08% of the population.

There were 1,126 households, out of which 44.8% had children under the age of 18 living with them, 44.6% were married couples living together, 19.4% had a female householder with no husband present, and 25.8% were non-families. 17.4% of all households were made up of individuals, and 3.0% had someone living alone who was 65 years of age or older.  The average household size was 3.10 and the average family size was 3.41.

In the CDP, the population was spread out, with 30.3% under the age of 18, 10.4% from 18 to 24, 34.7% from 25 to 44, 17.5% from 45 to 64, and 7.1% who were 65 years of age or older.  The median age was 30 years. For every 100 females, there were 106.4 males.  For every 100 females age 18 and over, there were 103.8 males.

The median income for a household in the CDP was $31,331, and the median income for a family was $32,402. Males had a median income of $26,563 versus $21,587 for females. The per capita income for the CDP was $18,231.  About 18.4% of families and 22.2% of the population were below the poverty line, including 23.3% of those under age 18 and 7.4% of those age 65 or over.

As of 2000, English was the first language for 65.12% of all residents, while Spanish made up 33.76%, and French Creole was the mother tongue for 1.12% of the population.

References

Census-designated places in Palm Beach County, Florida
Census-designated places in Florida